The Southwest Prairie Conference (SPC) is an athletic and competitive activity conference consisting of twelve public high schools in Northern Illinois. These high schools are all members of the Illinois High School Association.

History 
The conference began competing during the 2006–2007 academic year, with Minooka Community High School, Morris Community High School, Oswego High School, Oswego East High School, Plainfield Central High School, Plainfield North High School, and Plainfield South High School being the founding members. All but Romeoville and Plainfield North made up the South Division of the Suburban Prairie Conference. Plainfield North was a newly established school and Romeoville came from the former South Inter-Conference Association North division. Morris left the SPC following the 2008–09 school year to join the North Central Illinois Conference. Newly established Plainfield East High School would replace them.

Joliet Central and Joliet West High Schools joined the conference from the Southwest Suburban Conference at the start of the 2016–2017 school year, following a 2014 decision. Both West Aurora High School, of the Upstate Eight Conference, and Yorkville High School, of the former Northern Illinois Big 12 Conference, were admitted to the SPC in 2018 and began conference play during the 2019–20 school year.

Member schools

East Division

West Division

Membership timeline

References

External links
Official website 

High school sports conferences and leagues in the United States
Illinois high school sports conferences
High school sports in Illinois